A forehead lift, also known as a browlift or browplasty, is a cosmetic surgery procedure used to elevate a drooping eyebrow that may obstruct vision and/or to remove the deep “worry” lines that run across the forehead.

History
The first documented medical discussion about a forehead lift was written in 1910 by the famous German surgeon Erich Lexer.

Current surgical techniques
Since the advent of the hugely popular wrinkle remover, Botox (Dysport in the United Kingdom and Europe) many consumers have eschewed the invasive surgery altogether, opting for Botox injections every four to six months to get the same results. Botox is also used after some forehead lift procedures to increase the effects of the surgeries.

Endoscopic surgery is often employed in forehead lifts. An endoscope is a surgical system with thin, pencil-sized arms that are inserted through three to five incisions about 3/8 of an inch long. One of the instrument’s arms is a lighted camera that displays what it sees under the patient’s skin on a television monitor. Other arms on the Endoscope carry actual surgical tools that perform cutting, or grasping functions. The surgeon watches the television monitor to guide his movements.

Risks
When surgeons have problems with an endoscopic forehead lift, -- in about one percent of cases -- they finish the procedure by switching to the open forehead lift method.

Complications are said to be rare and minor when a forehead lift is performed by a surgeon trained in the technique. However, it is possible for the surgical process to damage the nerves that control eyebrow and forehead movements. Hair loss can also occur along the scar edges in the scalp when an incision is made through the hairline.  Moreover, infection and bleeding are possible with any surgical procedure.

Patients who have Endotine implants in their foreheads risk moving their newly adjusted tissues with relatively small movements just after the operation and before complete healing takes place. While the implant absorbs into the body, the Endotine generally does not support the very thick forehead flesh and heavy brows often seen in some overweight males.

References

External links
Foreheadplasty Flash animation

Plastic surgery
Oral and maxillofacial surgery
Otorhinolaryngology